Ronald Perry Jones (born April 11, 1951) is a Canadian former professional ice hockey defenceman.

Jones was born in Vermilion, Alberta. Selected by the Boston Bruins in the 1971 NHL Entry Draft, Jones played for the Bruins, Pittsburgh Penguins, and Washington Capitals between 1972 and 1976. The rest of his career was mainly spent in the minor American Hockey League.

Career statistics

Regular season and playoffs

Awards
 WCHL All-Star Team – 1971

External links

Profile at hockeydraftcentral.com

1951 births
Living people
Boston Bruins draft picks
Boston Bruins players
Canadian ice hockey defencemen
Edmonton Oil Kings (WCHL) players
Hershey Bears players
Ice hockey people from Alberta
National Hockey League first-round draft picks
People from the County of Vermilion River
Pittsburgh Penguins players
Richmond Robins players
Washington Capitals players